Skateraw is a small settlement in East Lothian, Scotland, centred on the Georgian farmhouse of Skateraw House and Skateraw Farm. It was formerly the site of a World War I airfield.

Leisure Facilities
Skateraw has a small sandy, crescent-shaped beach sheltered within Skateraw harbour, although the skyline is rather dominated by the large Torness nuclear power station which sits at the eastern end of the harbour. Part of the John Muir Way runs along a walkway along the seawall protecting the power station. There is a car park and public toilets near the beach which are open from May to September.

Skateraw House
Skateraw house is a B listed 6 bedroom Georgian farmhouse. Robert Burns mentions visiting Skateraw House in his Border Journals, albeit the current house post dates his visit.

World War I Airfield and the war memorial
The area was home to a military aerodrome during the First World War, this was manned by No.77 Squadron of the Royal Flying Corps, later the Royal Air Force, which operated Royal Aircraft Factory B.E.2 and B.E.12 aeroplanes. The airfield opened in 1917 and closed in 1919. There is a commentating plaque on the site which was unveiled there on 11 November 2018.

In the 1930s, the minister of the Canongate church in Edinburgh, Reverend Ronald Selby Wright, ran a club for the poor boys living in the parish. He frequently took them camping at Skateraw. A cross near the ruins at Skateraw is a memorial to six of these boys who were killed in World War II.

Natural history
Skateraw is located in an area which has rich limestone deposits, currently being exploited by the nearby Lafarge Cement Works at Whitesands. Extraction of lime has been conducted in this area for hundreds of years. There are limekilns dating from the 18th Century at the eastern end of the harbour. The calcareous rock also explains some of the botanical interest in this site, as the lime-rich rock favours plants which prefer an alkaline soil. Any plants living here must also be able to tolerate some salinity as these coastal grasslands can be subject to regular onshore gales from the North Sea. These factors lead to a  specific habitat and there are several species which are unique to this area within East Lothian, such as Autumn gentian, white horehound and yellow-horned poppy. The site is also a favoured site for birdwatchers looking for rare and scarce migrant birds in the Spring and Autumn.

See also
List of places in East Lothian

References

Ports and harbours of Scotland
Geography of East Lothian